Carabus exiguus absconditus is a subspecies of ground beetle in the subfamily Carabinae that is endemic to Sichuan, China.

References

exiguus absconditus
Beetles described in 2002
Beetles of Asia
Endemic fauna of Sichuan